The Lebo Member is a geologic member of the Fort Union Formation in Montana and Wyoming. It preserves fossils dating back to the Paleogene period.

See also

 List of fossiliferous stratigraphic units in Montana
 Paleontology in Montana

References

Paleogene Montana
Paleogene geology of Wyoming